The D.I.C.E. Award for Action Game of the Year is an award presented annually by the Academy of Interactive Arts & Sciences during the academy's annual D.I.C.E. Awards.  This award recognizes titles that follow the gameplay from the prospective of the character that the player is controlling. These games feature heavy weapons use and/or involve characters engaged in combat while moving through a linear or open environment. The opponent can either be controlled by another player or by the game. The award initially had separate awards for console action games and computer games at the 1st Annual Interactive Achievement Awards in 1998 with the first winners being GoldenEye 007 for console and Quake II for computer. There have been numerous mergers, additions of action-related games. The current version was officially introduced at the 11th Annual Interactive Achievement Awards in 2008, which was awarded to Call of Duty 4: Modern Warfare.

The most recent winner of the award is Vampire Survivors developed and published by indie developer, poncle.

History 

Initially, the Interactive Achievement Awards had separate awards for Console Action Game of the Year and Computer Action Game of the Year. In 2001, the awards for action games and adventure games were consolidated to Action/Adventure awards, recognizing titles in which players are challenged with real-time action activities and combat where possibly skill, accuracy and puzzle-solving are required. Additional categories for console and computer first person action games were added in 2003. This was probably because both winners for console and PC Action/Adventure in 2002 were first-person shooters, being Halo: Combat Evolved for console and Return to Castle Wolfenstein for PC. A category for Console Platform Action/Adventure Game of the Year was also introduced in 2003, which would be renamed to just Platform Action/Adventure Game of the Year in 2004. Starting in 2005, genre specific awards would no longer have separate awards for console and computer games. So there would be just one Action/Adventure Game of the Year award, which included platform games going forward and one First Person Action Game of the Year award. These would ultimately be replaced by Action Game of the Year and Adventure Game of the Year in 2008. 
 Console Action Game of the Year (1998–2000)
 Computer Action Game of the Year (1998–2000)
 Console Action/Adventure Game of the Year (2001–2005)
 Computer Action/Adventure Game of the Year (2001–2005)
 Console First Person Action Game of the Year (2003–2005)
 Computer First Person Action Game of the Year (2003–2005)
 Console Platform Action/Adventure Game of the Year (2003)
 Platform Action/Adventure Game of the Year (2004–2005)
 Action/Adventure Game of the Year (2006–2007)
 First Person Action Game of the Year (2006–2007)
 Action Game of the Year (2008–present)

Winners and nominees

1990s

2000s

2010s

2020s

Multiple nominations and wins

Developers and publishers 
Electronic Arts has published the most nominees for Action related Game of the Year awards. Activision and Ubisoft are tied with publishing the most winners for Action related Game of the Year awards. Ubisoft Montreal has developed the most nominees and the most award winners. Ubisoft Montreal and Ubisoft are the only developer and publisher, respectively to win more than award for the same game in the same year with Prince of Persia: The Sands of Time. Rockstar North and Rockstar Games also won multiple awards in the same year, but for different games. There have also been numerous back-to-back winners for the same award. Rare and Nintendo won Console Action Game of the Year in 1998 and 1999, Valve Corporation and Sierra On-Line for Computer Action Game of the Year in 1999 and 2000, and Ubisoft Montreal and Ubisoft for Platform Action/Adventure Game of the Year in 2004 and 2005. 2K Games is the only publisher to have back-to-back wins with different developers, being Gearbox Software in 2013 and Irrational Games in 2014.

Franchises 
The Call of Duty franchise has received the most nominations and won the most awards. The Tom Clancy's franchise is second in nominations and tied for second for most wins with Grand Theft Auto, Half-Life, Halo, and the Prince of Persia franchises. In the early years of the Interactive Achievement Awards when there were multiple awards for action related genres, some franchises had multiple nominations in the same year. 
The 6th Annual Interactive Achievement Awards in 2003 had three franchises received multiple nominations/awards with more than one game in action-related categories:
 Tom Clancy's Splinter Cell was nominated for Console Action/Adventure Game of the Year and Tom Clancy's Ghost Recon was nominated for Console First Person Action Game of the Year.
 Medal of Honor: Frontline was nominated for Console First Person Action Game of the Year and Medal of Honor: Allied Assault won Computer First Person Action Game of the Year.
 Grand Theft Auto: Vice City won Console Action/Adventure Game of the Year and Grand Theft Auto III won Computer Action/Adventure Game of the Year.
There were also some games that received the more than one nomination in the same year for action-related awards:
 Prince of Persia: The Sands of Time (2004): Won Computer Action/Adventure Game of the Year and Platform Action/Adventure Game of the Year.
 Max Payne 2: The Fall of Max Payne (2004): Nominated for Console Action/Adventure Game of the Year and Computer Action/Adventure Game of the Year.
 Full Spectrum Warrior (2005): Nominated for Console Action/Adventure Game of the Year and Computer Action/Adventure Game of the Year.
There were also some games that received multiple nominations spread across multiple years, mostly for expansion packs.
 Half-Life won Computer Action Game of the Year in 1999 and the expansion pack Opposing Force won the same award in 2000.
 Tom Clancy's Rainbow Six was nominated Computer Action Game of the Year in 1999 and 2000. The first was for the release on Microsoft Windows; the second was the release on Mac OS X.
 Grand Theft Auto III was nominated for Console Action/Adventure Game of the Year in 2002 and won Computer Action/Adventure Game of the Year in 2003.
 Grand Theft Auto: Vice City won Console Action/Adventure Game of the Year in 2003 and was nominated for Computer Action/Adventure Game of the Year in 2004.
 Half-Life 2 won Computer First Person Action Game of the Year in 2005 and the Episode One expansion was nominated for First Person Action Game of the Year in 2007.
 Destiny won in 2015 and the expansion pack The Taken King was nominated in 2016.
 Destiny 2 was nominated in 2018 and the expansion pack Forsaken was nominated in 2019.
The are currently only two franchises that have back-to-back wins for the same action-related award. The first was Half-Life for Computer Action Game of the Year in 1999 and 2000. The second was Prince of Persia for Platform Action/Adventure Game of the Year in 2004 and 2005.

Notes

References 

D.I.C.E. Awards
Awards established in 1998
Awards for best video game